In Islam, the place of punishment for unbelievers and other evildoers in the afterlife, or hell, is an "integral part of Islamic theology", and has "occupied an important place in the Muslim belief". It is often called by the proper name Jahannam. Simultaneously, jahannam is a term specifically for the upper most layer of hell, functioning as a purgatory for Muslim sinners.

The importance of Hell in Islamic doctrine is that it is an essential element of the Day of Judgment, which is one of the six articles of faith (belief in  God, angels, books, prophets, the Day of Resurrection and providence) "by which the Muslim faith is traditionally defined."

Punishment and suffering in Hell, in mainstream Islam, is physical, psychological and spiritual, and varies according to the sins of the condemned person. Its excruciating pain and horror described in the Qu'ran often parallels the pleasure and delights of paradise (Jannah).  It is commonly believed by Muslims that confinement to hell is temporary for Muslims but not for others, 
and Muslim scholars disagree over whether Hell itself will last for eternity (the major view), or whether God's mercy will lead to it eventually being eliminated.

The common belief among Muslims holds that Jahannam coexists with the temporal world, just as Jannah (the Islamic paradise), does, (rather than being created after Judgment Day).
Hell is described physically in different ways by different sources of Islamic literature. It is enormous in size, and located below Paradise. It has seven levels (each one more severe than the one above it), (the Quran specifically refers to "seven gates"); but it is also said to be a huge pit over which the bridge of As-Sirāt crosses and the resurrected walk; to have mountains, rivers, valleys and "even oceans" filled with disgusting fluids; and also to be able to walk (controlled by reins), and ask questions, much  like a sentient being.

Sources

Pre-Islamic: Tanakh, New Testament and Babylonical Talmud

In the Old Testament "hinnom" or Gei-ben-Hinnom, the Valley of the Son of Hinnom is an accursed Valley in Jerusalem where allegedly child sacrifices had taken place. In the gospels, Jesus talks about "Gehenna" (Greek rendering) as a place "where the worm never dies and the fire is never quenched". (Mark 9:48) In the apocryphal book of 4 Ezra, written around the 2nd century, Gehinnom appears as a transcendental place of punishment. This change comes to completion in the Babylonian Talmud, written around 500 CE.

Quran 
Most of how Muslims picture and think about Jahannam comes from the Quran, according to scholar Einar Thomassen, who found nearly 500 references to Jahannam/hell (using a variety of names) in the Quran.

An example of Quranic verses about hell is 
Surely the day of decision is (a day) appointed:
The day on which the trumpet shall be blown so you shall come forth in hosts,
And the heaven shall be opened so that it shall be all openings,
And the mountains shall be moved off so that they shall remain a mere semblance.
Surely hell lies in wait,
A place of resort for the inordinate,
Living therein for ages.
They shall not taste therein cool nor drink
But boiling and intensely cold water,
Requital corresponding.
Surely they feared not the account,
And called Our communications a lie, giving the lie (to the truth).
And We have recorded everything in a book,
So taste! For We will not add to you aught but chastisement (Q.78:17-30)

Among the different terms and phrases mentioned above that refer to hell in the Quran, Al-nar (the fire) is used 125 times, jahannam 77 times, jaheem (blazing flames) 26 times, (23 times by another count).
 
The description of Jahannam as a place of blazing fire appears in almost every verse in the Quran describing hell.
One collection of  descriptions of hell found in the Quran include "rather specific indications of the tortures of the Fire": flames that crackle and roar; fierce, boiling waters, scorching wind, and black smoke, roaring and boiling as if it would burst with rage.

Hell is described as being located below Paradise, 
having seven gates and "for every gate there shall be a specific party" of sinners (Q.15:43-44). The Quran also mentions wrongdoers having "degrees (or ranks) according to their deeds", (which some scholars believe refers to the "specific parties" at each of the gates); and of there being "seven heavens ˹in layers˺, and likewise for the earth" (Q.65:12), (though this doesn't indicate that the seven layers of earth are hell). The one mention of levels of hell is that hypocrites will be found in its very bottom.

Inmates and their sins 
Among those specifically mentioned in the Quran as being punished in hell are "most typically", (according to Thomassen), unbelievers (al-kafirun). These include people that lived during Mohammad's days, the Mushrikun (enemies of Mohammad who worshiped idols) (Q.10:24) and the "losers" (enemies of Mohammad who died in war against Mohammad) (Q.21:70), as well as broad categories of sinners: apostate Muslims (Q.3:86-87), "hypocritical Muslims" (Munafiq, i.e. those who pretend to submit to God while actually not believing)  (Q.4:140), the self-content (“those who do not expect to meet Us [God], being pleased and content with this worldly life, and who are heedless of Our signs ...") (Q.10:7-8, 17:18) those who commit the eternal sin of shirk (Q.4:48,116), and those who do not believe in certain key doctrines of Islam:  those who deny the divine origin of the Quran (Q.74:16-26), or  the coming of Judgement Day (Q.25:11-14).

In addition are those who have committed serious criminal offenses against other human beings: the murder of a believer (Q.4:93, 3:21), usury (Q.2:275), devouring the property of an orphan (Q.4:10), slander (Q.104), particularly of a chaste woman (Q.24:23).

Some prominent people mentioned in hadith and the Quran as suffering in hell or destined to suffer there are: Fir'awn (viz., the pharaoh of The Exodus, mentioned in Surah Yunus, specifically Q:10:90-92), the wives of Nuh (aka Noah) and Lut (aka Lot mentioned in Surah At-Tahrim, specifically Q:66-10), and Abu Lahab and his wife (who were contemporaries and enemies of Muhammad and mentioned in Surah Al-Masadd, specifically Q:111).

Punishments 
Punishments in hell described in the Quran tend to revolve around   "skin sensation and digestion".

Its wretched inhabitants sigh and wail, their scorched skins are constantly exchanged for new ones so that they can taste the torment anew, drink festering water and though death appears on all sides they cannot die. They are linked together in chains of 70 cubits, wearing pitch for clothing and fire on their faces have boiling water that will be poured over their heads, melting their insides as well as their skins, and hooks of iron to drag them back should they try to escape, their remorseful admissions of wrongdoing and pleading for forgiveness are in vain.

Hell's resemblance to a prison is strong. Inmates have chains around their necks (Q.13.5, 34:33, 36:8, 78:4, etc.), are "tethered" by hooks of iron (Q.22:21), and are guarded by "merciless angels" (Q.66.6). (These angels and their subordinates were later called Zabaniyah, term from another Quranic verse 
.)

Inmates of hell will be thirsty and hungry "constantly". Their fluids will include boiling water (Q.6:70), melted brass, and/or be bitterly cold, "unclean, full of pus".
In addition to  fire (Q.2:174) there are three different unique sources of food in hell:
 Ḍari, a dry desert plant that is full of thorns and fails to relieve hunger or sustain a person (Q88:6); 
 ghislin, which is only mentioned once (in Q69:36, which states that it is the only nourishment in hell); 
 heads of devils hanging from the tree of  zaqqum, that "springs out of the bottom of Hell". (These are mentioned three or four times: Q.17:60 (as the "cursed tree"),  Q.37:62-68,  Q.44:43,  Q.56:52.)

Psychological torments are humiliation (Q.3:178), and listening to "sighs and sobs". (Q.11:106).

There are at least a couple of indications that physical rather than "spiritual or psychological" punishment predominates in jahannam according to scholars Smith and Haddad. For example, the Quran notes that inmates of jahannam will be denied the pleasure of "gazing on the face of God", but nowhere does it state "that this loss contributed to the agony" the inmates experience. When the Quran describes the regret the inmates express for the deeds that put them in hell, it is "for the consequences" of the deeds "rather than for the actual commission of them".

Hadith 
There are "scores" of hadith or "short narratives traced back to the Prophet or his Companions"  from "the third/ninth century onwards", that "greatly elaborate" on the Quranic image of hell.
 Organization, size, guards
While the Quran speaks of the seven gates of hell, "relatively early" hadith attest that hell has seven levels. This interpretation became "widespread" in Islam. It is also in hadith (and not the Quran) that As-Sirat, the bridge over hell that all resurrected souls must cross, is mentioned.

Some hadith describe the size of hell as enormous. It is so deep that if a stone were thrown into it, it would fall for 70 years before reaching the bottom (according to one hadith). Another states that the breadth of each of Hell's walls is equivalent to a distance covered by a walking journey of 40 years.  According to another source (Qurṭubī) it takes "500 years" to get from one of its levels to another.

Traditions often describe this in multiples of seven: hell has seventy thousand valleys, each with "seventy thousand ravines, inhabited by seventy thousand serpents and scorpions".

According to one hadith, hell will be vastly more populous than Paradise. Out of every one thousand people entering into the afterlife, nine hundred and ninety-nine of them will end up in the fire. (According to at least one scholarly salafi interpretation, the hadith expresses the large disparity between the number of saved and damned rather than a  specific literal  ratio.)

Malik in Hadith quotes Mohammed as saying that the "fire of the children of Adam [humans] which they kindle is a seventieth part of the fire of Jahannam." He also describes that fire as "blacker than tar".

In book 87 Hadith 155, "Interpretation of Dreams" of Sahih al-Bukhari, Muhammad is reported to have talked of angels guarding hell, each with "a mace of iron", and  describes Jahannam as a place  "built inside like a well and it had side posts like those of a well, and beside each post there was an angel carrying an iron mace. I saw therein many people hanging upside down with iron chains, and I recognized therein some men from the Quraish".

Punishments
Hadiths introduce punishments, reasons and revelations not mentioned in the Quran. In both Quranic verses and hadiths, "the Fire"  is "a gruesome place of punishment that is always contrasted with Jannah, "the Garden" (paradise). Whatever characteristic "the Garden offered, the Fire usually offered the opposite conditions." Several hadith describes a part of hell that is extremely cold rather than hot, known as Zamhareer.

According to Bukhari, lips are cut by scissors. Other traditions added flogging. An Uighur manuscript also mentions drowning, stoning and falling from heights. Based on hadiths, the sinners are thought to carry signs in accordance with their sins.

Inmates and their sins
Hadith describe types of sinners populating hell.  Seven sins doom a person to Hell, according to reports of as-Saheehayn, (i.e. the reports of the two most esteemed Sunni hadith collections: al-Bukhaari and Muslim): “Associating others with Allah (shirk or idolatry); witchcraft; killing a soul whom Allah has forbidden us to kill, except in cases dictated by Islamic law; consuming orphans’ wealth; consuming riba (usury); fleeing from the battlefield; and slandering chaste, innocent women.”

According to a series of hadith,  Muhammad claims the majority of the inhabitants of hell will be women, due to an inclination for gossip, conjecture, ungratefulness of kind treatment from their spouses and idle chatting.  
Salafi scholar ʿUmar Sulaymān al-Ashqar (d. 2012), affirms the arguments of al-Qurṭubī, that women have a attachment to the here and now, inability to control their passions; but allows that despite this, many women are good and pious and will go to Paradise, and some are even superior to many men in piety.

However, other hadith imply that the majority of people in paradise will be women. Since the number of men and women are approximately equal, Al-Qurtubi attempts to reconcile the conflicting hadith  by suggesting that many of the women in Hell are there only temporarily and will eventually be brought reside in  Paradise; thereafter the majority of the people of Paradise would be women. 

Other people populating hell mentioned in hadith include, but are not limited to, the mighty, the proud and the haughty. Einar Thomassen writes that this almost certainly refers to those too proud and haughty to submit to God, i.e. unbelievers (the literal translation of Muslim is one who submits to God).

Sahih Muslim quotes Muhammad as saying that suicides would reside in Jahannam forever.
According to Hadith collector Muwatta Imam Malik (Imam Malik), Muhammad said: "Truly a man utters words to which he attaches no importance, and by them he falls into the fire of Jahannam."

Al-Bukhari in book 72:834 added to the list of dwellers in Jahannam: "The people who will receive the severest punishment from Allah will be the picture makers". Use of utensils made of precious metals could also land its users in Jahannam: "A person who drinks from a silver vessel brings the fire of Jahannam into his belly". As could starving a cat to death: "A woman was tortured and was put in Hell because of a cat which she had kept locked till it died of hunger."

At least one hadith indicates the importance of faith in avoiding hell, stating: "... no one will enter Hell in whose heart is an atom's weight of faith.”

Eschatological manuals 

"Eschatological manuals" were written after the hadith, they compiled the hadith on hell, and also developed descriptions of Jahannam "in more deliberate ways". While the Quran and hadith tend to describe punishments that nonbelievers are forced to give themselves, the manuals illustrate external and more dramatic punishment, through devils, scorpions, and snakes.

Manuals dedicated solely to the subject of Jahannam include Ibn Abi al-Dunya's Sifat al-nar, and al-Maqdisi's Dhikr al-nar. 

Other manuals—such as texts by al-Ghazali and the 12th-century scholar Qadi Ayyad -- "dramatise life in the Fire", and present "new punishments, different types of sinners, and the appearance of a multitude of devils," to exhort the faithful to piety. His hell has a structure with a specific place for each type of sinners.

According to Leor Halevi, between the moment of death and the time of their burial ceremony, "the spirit of a deceased Muslim takes a quick journey to Heaven and Hell, where it beholds visions of the bliss and torture awaiting humanity at the end of days".

In The Soul's Journey After Death, Ibn Qayyim Al-Jawziyya, a theologian in the 14th century, writes explicitly of punishments faced by sinners and unbelievers in Jahannam. These are directly related to the wrongdoer's earthly transgressions.

Inmates and their sins
In addition to those who engage in traditional sins of  wine drinking, fornication, sodomy, suicide, atheism (dahriyya); hell is where those "who sleep during prayer (or speak of worldly matters during it), or  deny the doctrine of predestinarianism or assert absolute free-will (Qadarites), are punished. Another tradition consigns to the seven different levels of hell, seven different types of "mischievous" Islamic scholars.  Government authorities are also threatened with hell, but often in "oblique ways".

Location and topography

Location
There are many traditions on the location of paradise and hell, but not all of them "are easily pictured or indeed mutually reconcilable". For example, some describe hell as in the lowest earth, while one scholar (Al-Majlisī) describes hell as "surrounding" the earth.  
Islamic scholars speculated on where the entrance to hell might be located. Some thought the sea was the top level, or that the sulphourus well in Hadramawt (in present-day Yemen), allegedly haunted by the souls of the wicked, was  the entrance to the underworld. Others considered the entrance in the valley of Hinnom (surrounding the Old City of Jerusalem). In a Persian work, the entry to hell is located in a gorge called Wadi Jahannam (in present-day  Afghanistan).

Seven levels
Einar Thomassen writes that the seven levels of hell mentioned in hadith "came to be associated" with the seven names used in the Quran to refer to hell, with a category of inmates assigned to each level.
Jahannam was reserved for Muslims who had committed grave sins.
al-Laza (the blaze) for the Jews
al-Hutama (the consuming fire) for the Christians
al-Sa'ir for the  Sabians
al-Saqar (the scorching fire) for the Zoroastrians
al-jahim (the hot place) for the idolaters
al-Hawiya (the abyss) for the hypocrites.
"Various similar models exist with a slightly differing order of names", according to Christian Lange, and he and A. F. Klein give similar lists of levels. Al-Laza and al-Saqar are switched in Lange's list, and there is no accompanying type of unbelievers for each level. In A. F. Klein's list, it is the names of the levels that's  not included, and instead of a level for Zoroastrians there is one for "witches and fortunetellers".

Another description of the layers of hell comes from "models such as that recorded by al-Thalabi (died 427/1035)" corresponding to "the seven  earths of medieval Islamic cosmology"; 
the place of hell before the Day of Resurrection. This idea derives from the concept of "seven earths", each beneath the surface of the known world, serving as a sort of underworld, with hell at its bottom. Sources Miguel Asin Palacios and  Patrick Hughes, Thomas Patrick Hughes describe these levels as:
 Adim (surface), inhabited by mankind and jinn.
 Basit (plain), the prison of winds, from where the winds come from.
 Thaqil (region of distress), the antechamber of hell, in which dwell men with the mouth of a dog, the ears of a goat and the cloven hoof of an ox.
 Batih (place of torrents or swamps), a valley through which flows a stream of boiling sulphur to torment the wicked. The dweller in this valley have no eyes and in place of feet, have wings.
 Hayn (region of adversity), in which serpents of enormous size devour the infidels.
 Masika/Sijjin (store or dungeon), the office where sins are recorded and where souls are tormented by scorpions of the size of mules. In tafsir, this place is sometimes considered the lowest place instead.
 As-Saqar (place of burning) and Athara (place of damp and great cold) the home of Iblis, who is chained, his hand fastened one in front of and the other behind him, except when set free by God to chastise his demons.

A large number of hadith about Muhammad's tour of hell during the miʿrāj, describe the various sinners and  their torments.

The first mansion is an ocean of fire comprising seventy lesser seas, and on the  shore of each sea stands a city of fire. In each city are seventy thousand dwellings;  in each dwelling, seventy thousand coffins of fire, the tombs of men and women,  who, stung by snakes and scorpions, shriek in anguish. These wretches, the Keeper  enlightens Mahomet, were tyrants.

In the second mansion beings with blubber lips writhe under the red-hot forks  of demons, while serpents enter their mouths and eat their bodies from within.  These are faithless guardians, devoured now by serpents even as they once devoured  the inheritances committed to their trust. Lower down usurers stagger about,  weighed down by the reptiles in their bellies. Further, shameless women hang by  the hair that they had exposed to the gaze of man. Still further down liars and  slanderers hang by their tongues from red-hot hooks lacerating their faces with  nails of copper. Those who neglected the rites of prayer and ablution are now  monsters with the head of dogs and the bodies of swine and are the food of  serpents. In the next mansion drunkards suffer the torture of raging thirst, which  demons affect to quench with cups of a liquid fire that burns their entrails. Still lower, hired mourners and professional women singers hang head downwards and  howl with pain as devils cut their tongues with burning shears. Adulterers are  punished in a cone-shaped furnace... and their shrieks are drowned by the curses  of their fellow damned at the stench of their putrid flesh. In the next mansion  unfaithful wives hang by their breasts, their hands tied to their necks. Undutiful  children are tortured in a fire by fiends with red-hot forks. Lower down, shackled  in collars of fire, are those who failed to keep their word. Murderers are being  knifed by demons in endless expiation of their crime. Lastly, in the fourteenth and  lowest mansion of the first storey, are being crucified on burning pillars those who failed to keep the rule of prayer; as the flames devour them, their flesh  is seen  gradually to peel off their bones.
See also Smith & Haddad, Islamic Understanding,  1981: p.86-7

Pit
In addition to having levels, an important feature of  Judgement Day is that hell is  a huge pit over which the bridge of As-Sirāt crosses, and from which sinners fall making their arrival in hell (see "Eschatological manuals" above) Christian Lange writes "it made sense to picture [hell]  as a vast subterranean funnel, spanned by the Bridge, which the resurrected pass on their way to paradise, with a brim (shafīr) and concentric circles leading down into a central pit at the bottom (qaʿr)."

But along with a pit and levels, hell also has mountains, rivers, valleys and "even oceans" filled with "fire, blood, and pus".

Sentience
Along with being a pit and a series of levels, some scholars, like al-Ghazali and the thirteenth-century Muslim scholar Al-Qurtubi, describe hell as a gigantic sentient being, rather than a place. In Paradise and Hell-fire in Imam al Qurtubi, Qurtubi writes, "On the Day of Judgment, hell will be brought with seventy thousand reins. A single rein will be held by seventy thousand angels...". Based on verse 67:7 and verse 50:30, Jahannam inhales and has "breaths". Islamicity notes "the animalistic nature" of "The Fire" in Quranic verse 25:12: "When the Hellfire sees them from a distant place, they will hear its fury and roaring". According to verse 50:30, God will ask Jahannam if it is full and Jahannam will answer: "Are there any more (to come)?"

Inmates
Thomassen writes that in Islamic thought there was "a certain amount of tension" between the two "distinct functions" of hell: to punish disbelievers/ non-Muslims and to punish anyone who committed serious sins—both of which could draw support from Quranic verses and hadith. Factors involved in who will be consigned to hell are: 
Unforgiveableness of unbelief. According to Smith and Haddad, perhaps "almost the only point on which Muslim thinkers completely agreed" was that it was  "certain that the one unpardonable sin, that for which the pain of the Fire is assured, is refusal to testify to the tawẖīd (the indivisible oneness) of God, called either kufr (unbelief) or shirk (worshiping other besides the one God).
God's mercy. "The tendency has been to suggest that even grave sinners may hope for  Gods mercy, as long as they have professed belief and are Muslims", based on (two types of) Quranic verses: 
"Indeed, Allah does not forgive associating others with Him ˹in  worship˺ but forgives anything else of whoever He wills ..." (Q.4:48), 
"Whoever commits evil or wrongs themselves then seeks Allah’s forgiveness will certainly find Allah All-Forgiving, Most Merciful" (Q.4:110); 
"So whoever does an atom’s weight of good will see it" (Q.99:7-8) (and would be recompensed). 
That all human beings "are responsible" for their actions in this world, and all (even Muslims) face a "real possibility" of going to hell, (Q.19:71); While this idea may conflict with the one above, it "has continued to play an important role throughout the history of Islam";   
God's freedom  to send to Paradise or Hell whoever he chooses, 
"We do certainly know best those who deserve most to be burned therein" (Q.19:70); 
"Indeed, Allah does not forgive associating others with Him ˹in worship˺ but forgives anything else of whoever He wills". (Q.4:48); 
What sins are considered grave enough to merit damnation ("There is no fixed canon of mortal sins in Islamic theology"); 
and whether if grave sins such as usury, murder of another Muslim, are not unpardonable in themselves, they are sufficiently serious that those that commit them cease to be Muslims and become guilty of  unbelief, a sin that is unpardonable. (a "famous" issue in the theological debates of early Islam between Khawarij, Murji'a, Mutazila, Ash'ari).
"Ultimately" the view of the Ash'arite school prevailed in "classical Islamic theology": God was free to judge as he chose, but on the other hand all believers can feel assured of salvation.

This left the issue of how/whether to punish sinful Muslims (to "ensure ... moral and religious discipline" and responsibility for individual actions). One solution was to reserve for Muslims the highest level of hell with the most lenient punishments; but a "more common" solution one was to make the stay of Muslims in hell temporary.

And also the issue of whether People of the Book, are a variety of believer or unbelievers destined for hell. In two places in the Quran, almost identical verses seem to indicate they are saved:
"Surely those who believe, and those  who are Jews, and the Christians, and the Sabians, whoever believes in  Allah and the Last day and does good, they shall have their reward from their Lord, and there is no fear for them, nor shall they grieve" (Q.2:62; cf. 5:69)
but there "exists a strong exegetical tradition" that claims these verses were abrogated by a later verse indicating a much less pleasant hereafter: 
"... .whoever desires a religion other than Islam, it shall not be accepted from him, and in the hereafter he shall be one of the losers." (Q.3:85)

Timeline
Quranic verses suggest that Judgement Day, Pardise and Hell are not "conceived to lie" off in some indefinite future, but "immediately ahead; it is now, or almost there already".

It is also a common belief among Muslims that hell, (like paradise), is not awaiting the destruction of earth and arrival of Judgement Day, but  "coexists in time" with the temporal world, having already been created. The basis of this belief was the Quranic statement "hell has been prepared (uʿiddat) for the unbelievers", and also hadith reporting that Muhammad had seen the punishment of sinners in hell during his miraculous miraj journey on a winged creature.

Eternal or temporary
The common belief among Muslims (as indicated above) is that duration in hell is temporary for Muslims but not for others. 
This combines in Jahannam two concepts: an eternal hell (for unbelievers), and a place (an "outer level" of hell was sometimes called al-barrāniyya), 
resembling the Christian Catholic idea of purgatory (for believers eventually destined for heaven after punishment for their  sins).

Several verses in the Quran mention the eternal nature of Hell or both Paradise and Hell, 
or that the damned will linger in hell for ages. Two verses in the Quran (6:128 and 11:107) emphasize that consignment to hell is horrible and eternal — but include the caveat "except as God (or your Lord) wills it", which some scholars considered an exemption from the eternity of hell. which suggests to some that Jahannam will be destroyed some day, 
so that its inhabitants may either be rehabilitated or cease to exist. The concept of hell's annihilation is referred to as fanāʾ al-nār. 
Thomassen writes that "several types of concerns" weigh "against the idea of an eternal hell in Islamic thought": belief in the mercy of God; resistance to the idea that Muslims—even great sinners—would "end up together with the disbelievers in the hereafter"; and resistance to the idea that "something other than God himself might have eternal existence".

The Ulama (Islamic scholars) disagree on this issue. According to Christian Lange, "the majority" of theologians agreed that Hell like Paradise "was eternal". Ahmad ibn Hanbal argued the eternity of hell and paradise are proven by the Quran, although earths and heavens (sun, moon, stars) will perish. In modern times Shia cleric Sayyid Mujtaba Musavi Lari argues against the idea that hell will not last for eternity.

On the other hand, for Muʿtazilis, the eternity of paradise and hell posed a major problem, since they regard  God as the only eternal entity.
Egyptian Hanafi author al-Tahawi writes that God punishes the sinners in proportions to their offense in accordance with his justice, afterwards release them in accordance with his mercy.  Ibn Taymiyya (d.728/1328)  also argued for a limited abode in hell, based on the Quran and God's attribute of mercy.
(In more recent times fanāʾ al-nār has been supported by Rashīd Riḍā (d. 1936), İzmirli Ismail Hakkı (d.1946) Yūsuf al-Qarādāwī(d.2022).)

How optimistic Muslims were about whether they and the rest of humanity would avoid hellfire or at least long durations of it, varied considerably. The idea of the "demise of hell" (ibn Taymiyya, Yemenite ibn al-Wazir (d.840/1436) meant (or at least meant to these theologians) that God would provide for "universal salvation even for non-Muslims".
At the other end of the theological "spectrum" were fearful "renunciants" such as al-Hasan al-Basri.  Though Hasan was so holy he was considered a "pious exemplar" of his age, he still felt  great anxiety as to whether he would be among the lucky ones who would spend a mere  1000 years suffering in hell before being released to Jannah.

Doctrines and beliefs

Sufism 
Many prominent Sufis preached "the centrality of the love of God" for which focus on eternal reward was a "distraction".  Rabi'a al-'Adawiyya aka Rabia of Basra (died 801), is said to have proclaimed to passersby
"O God! If I worship You for fear of Hell, burn me in Hell, and if I worship You in hope of Paradise, exclude me from Paradise. But if I worship You for Your Own sake, grudge me not Your everlasting Beauty".

Similarly, Bāyazīd Basṭāmī (d. 234/848) proclaimed the fire of "God's love" burns a thousand times more intensely than hellfire.

Others did not take literally the Quran's verses on Paradise and Hell as physical places where believers are rewarded with pleasure and sinners tortured with pain.  According to ibn ʿArabī, Hell and Paradise are psychological states of the soul manifested after its separation from the body.
He believed Hell and Paradise are  only the distance or closeness from God, respectively, in the mind of resurrectant. The torments of Hell  wrong-doers endure are actually their conception of their distance from God, created by  their sinful indulgence in their earthly desires and the illusion of things other than God as existent. But  distance from God is also only illusory, because everything other than God is an illusion, since "everything is a form of the degrees of the Divine Existence". So in fact, Hell and Paradise are just as real as the current world, which is unreal in comparison to God.

Many ideas attributed Ibn Arabi have been rejected by Wahhabis. For example, Ahmad ibn Idris debated in detail with the then-Wahhabi Nasir al Kubaybi about sins committed by him and his students, and deviations that are said to have been propagated by Ibn Arabi. For the former, he explained that no human except the Prophet is protected from sins, and also he said that individual actions were to be judged in line with Qur'an and Sunnah only. About Ibn Arabi, he fiercely defended the stance that Ibn Arabi was a Muslim of sound faith and whatever contradicted this was in fact not from him.

Many other prominent Sufis too had more conventional attitudes, such as al-Ghazali, who warned Muslims, "your coming unto it (hellfire) is certain, while your salvation therefrom is no more than conjecture. … fill up your heart therefore with a dread of that destination."Moreover, Abd Al-Aziz Al-Dabbagh gave precise details of the locations of the two abodes in terms of Islamic Cosmology, while noting that the ignorance of existence of the two abodes at present alone suffices to lead someone to Hell, Shaykh Nazim clarified that the length of the stay may extend to an eternity for example for murderers, Shaykh Rifai attributed its bottom level to oppressors. Abdulqadir Jilani said that through the blessings of his students’ association with him none of them were going to enter Hell, Abu Madyan Al-Ghawth in Hikam likened working for other than God to the past behavior of Hell’s inhabitants.

Non-Sunni schools

Shia
According to a major Shia Islam website, al-Islam.org, Hellfire is the eternal destination of unbelievers, although another essay on the site states that there is a set of unbelievers known as ‘Jahil-e-Qasir’ (lit. ‘inculpable ignorant’), who "will attain salvation if they are truthful to their own religion" because the message of Islam either didn't reach them, or reached them in an incorrect form. For those Muslims "who have committed a certain number of lesser sins and offences, they shall either spend an appropriate amount of time in hellfire or receive the kindness and forgiveness of God".
Al-Islam also states: "According to the Qur`an and ahadith, heaven and hell exist at present. However, they will become fully apparent and represented only in the Hereafter ...".
Isma'ili
Isma'ili authors (such as Abu Yaqub al-Sijistānī) believe resurrection, heaven and hell do not involve physical bodies, but what is spiritual. Suffering of hell came from failure to be enlightened by the teachings of the Isma'ili Imam, but such suffering does  not require  resurrection. According to one source, they do not believe hell will last for eternity, based on their interpretation of Quranic verse 11:106. Instead, they believe hell to be a possible station of the soul's journey to its perfection in afterlife.
Ibadis
Ibadis believe sinning Ibadis and all non-Ibadis will be in hell forever.

Ahmadiyya
According to the Ahmadiyya movement (by way of their official website), the places of Paradise and Hell are actually images of man's own spiritual life during lifetime, hell is  a manifestation of his sins.  Contrary to the belief that sinners or at least unbelieving sinners will spend eternity in hell, 
"there are numerous passages in the Holy Quran showing that those in hell shall ultimately be taken out". Whereas the word "abad" used in the Quran has been translated as "eternity", it should be translated as "a long time", and the actual purpose of suffering in hell should not be thought of as  punishment of  sinners, but the purging  of "the evil effects of their deeds done in this life" for the sinners "spiritual advancement". This is because in the afterlife,  Muslims and Non-Muslims, even those "who never did any good deeds", will eventually be taken out of hell.

Modernism, postmodernism

According to Smith and Haddad, "The great majority of contemporary Muslim writers, ... choose not to discuss the afterlife at all". Islamic Modernists, according to Smith and Haddad, express a "kind of embarrassment with the elaborate traditional detail concerning life in the grave and in the abodes of recompense, called into question by modern rationalists".   Consequently, most of "modern Muslim Theologians" either "silence the issue" or reaffirm "the traditional position that the reality of the afterlife must not be denied but that its exact nature remains unfathomable".

The beliefs of Pakistani modernist Muhammad Iqbal (died 1938), were similar to the Sufi "spiritual and internalized interpretations of hell" of ibn ʿArabī, and Rumi, seeing paradise and hell "primarily as metaphors for inner psychic" developments. Thus hellfire is actually a state of realization of one's failures as a human being", and not a supernatural subterranean realm. Egyptian modernist Muhammad ʿAbduh, thought it was sufficient to believe in the existence of an  afterlife with rewards and punishment to be a true believer, even if you ignored "clear" (ẓāhir) hadith about hell.

Some postmodernists have found at least one sahih (authentic) hadith on hell unacceptable—the tradition of Muhammad stating, "most people in hell are women" has been explained as an attempt to "legitimate social control over women" (Smith and Haddad), or perpetuate "the moral, social, political, sectarian hierarchies" of medieval Islam (Lange).

Doubts and criticisms
In modern times a number of criticisms have been made of the Islamic doctrine of hell: 
the seeming relish with which the Quran and/or commentators  detail  "the torture and the sufferings awaiting the sinners",  the "boiling water, running sores, peeling skin, burning flesh, dissolving bowels, and crushing of skulls with iron maces"; what Christian Lange describes as indulging in "phantasies of violence and pain" which are "often shockingly violent, and frequently obscene"; Thomassen thinks shows an "almost sadistic delight"; and ibn Warraq finds out of character for  a creator who begins all but  two of the chapters of His holy book  with the statement that God is merciful and compassionate. 
Replies include that hell serves as deterrence. Fear of hell's horror will strengthen the will of the morally weak  to obey God and to turn away from the temptations of sinful pleasure and the pollution of unbelief; that the wholesome fear of God's "just punishments ... grounded in religious faith" is  very different than "coercion and force" (Mujtaba Musavi Lari).   God created Paradise and Hell because "the people should worship their Lord, desiring His reward and fearing of His torment." God being "the Wisest of the judges", knows that his creations "love security and benefits and hate misery and torture" (Islamweb). 
that the gruesome punishments of hell last for eternity, while the sins were committed over (some part) of a lifetime of a few decades. Antony Flew wonders if the "infinite punishment" of hell (where, for example, the skin of the damned being replaced with "fresh skins" when "their skins are roasted through" so that the process can continue for eternity Q.4:56), is out of proportion to the "finite offenses" of the damned. 
Shia cleric Mujtaba Musavi Lari acknowledges that this "presents a problem for many people", and offers a number of arguments: He notes that God's "essence is utterly pure of any trace of injustice", and reminds readers that "utter justice prevails in God's judging of men", with even small amounts of good being weighed in the balance; he quotes Imam Ja'far al-Sadiq that eternal punishment is appropriate because of the intention of the sinners was "to persist in sin" as long as they lived and if they had been "made immortal in this world" they would have kept on sinning indefinitely; and furthermore their sins may have long lasting consequences, and/or lead other humans "to the wrong path", spreading sin all over.
the standard doctrine that the eternal reward for non-believers is hell, "irrespective of who they were and what they did." E. Thomassen writes that while the traditional idea that hell is punishment for unbelievers and Paradise the reward for Muslims plays "an important role in the construction and maintenance" of Muslim religious identity, it has "become increasingly challenged" by the "common humanitarian values" of  global society. (One ex-Muslim -- "Abu Lahab"—writing in The Guardian Editor press review, felt he was  "forced out of Islam" because he could not accept the idea of eternal punishment of torture for non-Muslims. "I found it hard to understand why every non-believer would end up" in hell, no matter how kind and good they may have been.)
Conservative scholars (Muhammad Saalih Al-Munajjid and his subordinates) emphasize Islamic doctrine in the judging of whether someone goes to Paradise or Hell: “the point is not whether their morals are good, rather the point is whether they submit to Allaah ... and obey his commands.” In answering an audience question, well-known preacher Zakir Naik  compares the consigning to hell of otherwise righteous non-Muslims  (like Mother Teresa),  to giving a failing grade/mark to a student who scores 99 out of 100 in five of the six subjects they must pass, but fails one subject (comparing this to failing imam, i.e. Islamic faith).  Jonathan Brown concludes an examination of the matter by saying "anxiety over the fate" of human beings after death (whether Muslims or non-Muslims) "is best assuaged by trusting in God’s total justice and immense mercy". Finally, some, (such as Gabriel Said Reynolds) simply deny the traditional doctrine, arguing God will "find goodness, even holiness, in those who do not practice Islam.".
Abu Hamid al-Ghazali categorized non-Muslims into three categories:

1. People who never heard of the message, who live in far away lands, such as the Byzantines ("Romans"). These will be forgiven.
2. People who were exposed to a distorted understanding of Islam and have no recourse to correct that information. These too will be forgiven.
3. People who heard of Islam because they live in neighboring lands and mix with Muslims. These have no hope of salvation.

He also wrote about non-Muslims who have heard a distorted message: "The name of Muhammad has indeed reached their ears, but they do not know his true description and his character. Instead, they heard from the time they were young that a deceitful liar named Muhammad claimed to be a prophet. As far as I am concerned, such people are [excused] like those who the call of Islam has not reached, for while they have heard of the Prophet’s name, they heard the opposite of his true qualities. And hearing such things would never arouse one’s desire to find out who he was."

Islamic scholars disagree on duration of Hell's punishment. The common view holds that Hell will continue to exist for an eternity with some inhabitants, while others hold that Hell exists to purify rather than inflict pain, and may even cease to exist after a while. 

that God literally "creates beings to fill hell with", punishing his creatures for actions beyond their power to control, as reflected in verses such as 
 "If We had so willed, We could have given every soul its guidance, but now My Word is realized—'I shall fill Hell with jinn and men together.'" (Q.32.32.)
 "God misleads whom He will and whom He will He guides." (Q.14:4) 
and the logical conclusion of a world where God is omnipotent, controlling even the behavior of human beings. In the words of verse Q.9:51, 
"By no means can anything befall us [his creatures] but what God has destined for us." 
Michael Cook notes that "compassion is conspicuously absent" in these verses, and philosopher, political economist John Stuart Mill condemns the combination of predestination and hell as a "dreadful idealization of wickedness."
In reply the Hanafi fiqh fatwa site IslamQA states that predestination is one of those issues which God urges Muslims to "abstain from" speaking about  "as much as possible". "We must believe in predestination, yet we cannot assume that our actions are entirely bound by it." Though "everyone’s abode (for Jannat or Jahannam [i.e. for Paradise or Hell]) has been written”, because God "knows everything we have done", are currently doing, or will do in the future, nonetheless God has still "given us the choice in everything" we do.
Based on Sunni traditions, God wrote everything that will happen (in all of his creation) on a tablet before creating the world. Thus  it is asked: how can humans be punished for what God has determined they do. In this tradition, in Ashari thought, God created good and evil deeds, which humans decide upon—humans have their own possibility to choose, but God retains sovereignty of all possibilities. This still leaves the question of why God set out those people's lives (or the negative choice of deeds) which result in Hell, and why God made it possible to become evil. In Islamic thought, evil is considered to be movement away from good, and God created this possibility so that humans are able to recognize good. (In contrast, angels are unable to move away from good, therefore angels generally rank lower than humans as they have reached heaven because they lack the ability to perceive the world as humans do.)

Use in proselytizing
At least a couple of non-Muslims (Graeme Wood, Charles Baxter) have noted the use of dramatic Quranic/hadith descriptions of hell by Muslims for proselytizing. Both Muslims emphasized the Quranic story (Q.4:56) of how the skin of the condemned in hell will be continuously replaced with fresh skin once it is burned off so that the pain will always be fresh. "'It is very interesting, what happens to the skin. Every day the skin is burned off. ... And then each day, the God gives you new skin ... and every day the new skin is burned off.' He said this sentence with a certain degree of excitement ..."

Comparison with other religions

Christianity

Bible

Some of the Quranic parables describing the sufferings in hell resemble those of the Christian New Testament.

The Book of Revelation describes a "lake which burneth with fire and brimstone: which is the second death", which most Christians believe to be a description of Hell, comparable to Jahannam as "the fire". While the Quran describes Jahannam as having seven levels, each for different sins, the Bible (as regards the issue of levels), speaks of the "lowest Hell (Sheol)". It also refers to a "bottomless pit", comparable to the lowest layer of Jahannam in most Sunni traditions.

Christian popular culture

Just as Hell is often depicted as the seat of the devil in Christian culture (though not in the bible itself), so too some Islamic scholars describe it that way.

Al-Tha'alibis (961–1038) in his Qisas Al-Anbiya and Al-Suyutis Al-Hay’a as-samya fi l-hay’a as-sunmya describes Iblis as chained to the bottom of hell, commanding his hosts of demons from there. Also in the poetry of Al-Ma'arri, Iblis is the king of Jahannam. These depictions of Iblis as lord of hell simultaneously chained at its very bottom influenced Dante's representation of Lucifer and gave rise to the Christian depiction of hell as the seat of the devil. Inferno by Dante also shares the Islamic idea of dividing hell into multiple "circles". According to the Divine Comedy, each layer corresponding to another sin, with Satan inside a frozen area at the very bottom. As with Christian popular understanding of hell, ʿKitāb al-ʿAẓama, a popular cultural work, describes hell as inhabited not only by the Zabaniyya (guarding angels), but also by devils (shayatin), dwelling in the fourth layer of hell and rising up from coffins to torture the sinners.

As evident from late Ottoman poetry, the notion of Iblis ruling hell remained in Islamic popular tradition until modern times. In one of Ğabdulla Tuqay's works, Iblis' current abode in hell is compared to working in factories during Industrial Revolution. When Iblis gets weary about Hell, he remembers his time in Heaven. According to Salafi shaikh Osama al-Qusi, Iblis scolds the inhabitants of hell from a minbar, how they could have listened to him, knowing it is his nature to deceive them.

Notably, Iblis' temporary rule over Jahannam depends always on God's power and hell is still a form of punishment for Iblis himself. ("We have appointed only ˹stern˺ angels as wardens of the Fire." according to Q.74:31) Einar Thomassen points out that Iblis is chained to the floor of hell as punishment, whereas Malik is head of the 19 angels who guard hell, indicating it is the angels who are in charge and not the devils.

Christian Liberalism
In modern times some Christians and Christian denominations (such as Universalism) have rejected the concept of hell as a place of suffering and torment for sinners on the grounds that it is incompatible with a loving God. There are also symbolic and more merciful interpretations of hell among Muslims. Muslims Mouhanad Khorchide and Faheem Younus write that since the Quran states that God has "prescribed to himself mercy", and "... for him whose scales (of good deeds) are light. Hell will be his mother," suffering in Jahannam is not a product of vengeance and punishment, but a temporary phenomenon as the sinner is "transformed" in the process of confronting the truth about themselves. The idea of annihilation of hell was already introduced earlier by traditionalistic scholars, such as Ibn Taimiyya. However, according to at least one source—Christian evangelist Phil Parshall, who spent several decades observing and writing about Muslims in Asia—this has not been the common view of Muslims; Parshall writes that he "never met a Muslim who has attempted to undercut the bluntness and severity of their doctrine of hell."

Judeo-Islamic sources 
Arabic texts written by Jews in Judeo-Arabic script (particularly those which are identified with the Isra'iliyyat genre in the study of hadith) also feature descriptions of Jahannam (or Jahannahum). These seem to have been strongly influenced by the Islamic environment in which they were composed, and may be considered as holding many of the same concepts as those today identified with Islamic eschatology. A Judeo-Arabic version of a popular narrative known as The Story of the Skull (whose earliest version is attributed to Ka'ab al-Ahbar) offers a detailed picture of the concept of Jahannam. Here, Malak al-Mawt (the Angel of Death) and a number of sixty angels seize the soul of the dead and begin torturing him with fire and iron hooks. Two black angels named Nākir and Nakīr (identified with Munkar and Nakir in Islamic eschatology) strike the dead with a whip of fire and take him to the lowest level of Jahannam. Then, they order the Earth to swallow and crush the dead inside its womb, saying: "Seize him and take revenge, because he has stolen Allāh's wealth and worshipped others than Him". Following this, the dead is brought before the dais of God where a herald calls for throwing the dead into Jahannam. There he is put in shackles sixty cubits long and into a leather sackcloth full of snakes and scorpions.

The Judeo-Arabic legend in question explains that the dead is set free from the painful perogatory after twenty-four years. In a final quote alluding to Isaiah 58.8, the narrative states that "nothing will help Man on the last day except good and loving actions, deeds of giving charity to widows, orphans, the poor and the unfortunate."

Some Jewish sources such as Jerahmeel provide descriptive detail of hell-like places, divided into multiple levels; usually Sheol, which is translated as a grave or pit, is the place where humans descend upon death.

Zoroastrianism 
Like Islam, Zoroastrianism, holds that on Judgement Day all resurrected souls will pass over a bridge over hell (As-Sirāt in Islam, Chinvat Bridge in Zoroastrianism), and those destined for hell will find it  too narrow and fall below into their new abode.

Hinduism 
In case of a finite hell, as asserted by some Sufi thinkers, as a circulation of beginning and reset, the cosmology resembles to a hinduistic notion of an eternal cosmic process of generation, decay and destruction.

Detailed description of Journey of the soul and the punishments in Hell (Naraka) are detailed in Garuda Purana.

Buddhism
Some descriptions of Jahannam resemble Buddhist descriptions of Naraka from Mahayana sutras in regard of destroying inhabitants of hell physically, while their consciousness still remains and after the body is destroyed, it will regenerate again, thus the punishment will repeat. However, according to Buddhist belief, beings in Hell have a limited lifespan, as with all beings trapped in the cycle of Samsara; they will ultimately exhaust their bad karma, experience death, and be reborn in a higher realm.

See also
 Barzakh
 Gehenna
 Salvation

References

Explanatory notes

Citations

Books and journal articles
Asin Palacios, Miguel, 1968, Islam and the Divine Comedy, Trans. H. Sutherland, London: Frank Cass (First published 1926)

External links 

 
 

 
Afterlife places
Conceptions of hell
Islamic terminology